Kylie Moore-Gilbert is an Australian-British academic in Islamic studies. She was a lecturer at the University of Melbourne's Asia Institute and has carried out research into revolutions in the Middle East, in particular Bahraini politics and protests.

From September 2018 to November 2020, she was imprisoned in Iran on a charge of espionage. Moore-Gilbert denies the charges the Iranian government made against her, and no evidence of her alleged crimes has ever been made public. The Australian government has rejected the charges as "baseless and politically motivated".

Moore-Gilbert was released by Iran in a "prisoner swap" on 26 November 2020, in exchange for three Iranian prisoners in Thailand, two of whom had been convicted in connection with the 2012 Bangkok bomb plot.

In December 2020, Iran launched a media misinformation campaign against Moore-Gilbert "accusing her of coordinating with a former Bahraini MP, Jasim Husain, to steal secrets for Israel". Husain was accused of teaching Moore-Gilbert Arabic and Persian, and offering to help her spy on Shia exiles in Iran.

Life and career 
Moore-Gilbert graduated from All Saints' College in Bathurst in 2005. From 2009, she studied Asian and Middle Eastern Studies at Wolfson College at the University of Cambridge, and spent a year abroad in Israel learning Hebrew. She graduated with first class honours in Arabic and Hebrew in 2013. In 2017, she obtained a PhD from the University of Melbourne for a thesis entitled Shiʿi Opposition and Authoritarian Transition in Contemporary Bahrain: The Shifting Political Participation of a Marginalised Majority. Moore-Gilbert is currently Melbourne Early Career Academic Fellow and Lecturer in Islamic Studies at the Asia Institute of the University of Melbourne.

Detention in Iran 
The intelligence arm of the Islamic Revolutionary Guard Corps arrested her in September 2018 at Tehran Airport as she was leaving the country after attending a conference. She was subsequently tried and sentenced to ten years in prison for espionage. She was held in Evin Prison, reportedly in solitary confinement. Iranian authorities tried to recruit her as a spy in exchange for her release, which she declined. Sydney Morning Herald cited diplomatic and government sources to say she had been detained after it was discovered that she was in a relationship with an Israeli, leading to suspicions of her being a spy.

On 28 July 2020, Moore-Gilbert was said to have been transferred to Gharchak Women's Prison. In a phone call with Reza Khandan, the husband of jailed human rights lawyer Nasrin Sotoudeh, Moore-Gilbert said she felt hopeless, isolated, and unable to eat. Speaking Persian on the call, she said "I am so depressed. I don't have any phone card to call. I've asked the prison officers but they didn't give me a phone card. I [was last able to] call my parents about one month ago."

After she was jailed, Moore-Gilbert staged several hunger strikes. In May 2020, her family denied reports that she had attempted suicide in prison, or that she had been tortured by the Islamic Revolutionary Guards.

The Sunday Times reported in June 2020 that sources close to Gilbert's family had informed it of her receiving beatings at the hands of guards, due to her looking out for new prisoners, and suffered injuries on her hands and arms. They also said that the governor of Evin Prison had ordered her to be drugged to break her resistance. One source said that the beatings had caused her to repeatedly fall unconscious and she had major bruises over her entire body. Richard Ratcliffe, husband of Nazanin Zaghari-Ratcliffe who was also held in Evin prison, said Moore-Gilbert was being kept in solitary confinement and being severely abused, which had shocked Iranian activists who knew about it. In August 2020, the Australian 60 Minutes program on the Nine Network aired an episode called "Living Hell" about her imprisonment.

On 24 October 2020, Moore-Gilbert was said to have been transferred from Gharchak to an unknown location. Australian Foreign Minister Marise Payne said the Australian Government was "seeking further information" about Moore-Gilbert's location. On 29 October 2020, Moore-Gilbert was returned to Evin Prison. On 25 November 2020, Iranian state media announced that Moore-Gilbert had been released as part of a prisoner exchange. The Young Journalists Club, a news agency in Iran, stated that Moore-Gilbert was a "dual national spy [...] who worked for the Zionist regime", and that she had been exchanged for an Iranian businessman and two other Iranian citizens who had been held overseas.

Writing a personal note for the public on the day of her release, Moore-Gilbert wrote that despite her "long and traumatic ordeal" in jail in Iran and the "injustices" she had been subjected to, she departed Iran with the same sentiments as she came in: "as a friend and with friendly intentions."

During her detainment, the official advice to her family from the Australian Government was to keep a low profile, however in 2022 Moore-Gilbert said that greater media attention of her detention would have helped apply more pressure on the Department of Foreign Affairs and Trade to negotiate her release.
Moore-Gilbert was held for 804 days where she endured psychological torture and degrading treatment, as well as solitary confinement from her captors.

Her book, The Uncaged Sky: My 804 days in an Iranian prison, published by Ultimo Press, was shortlisted for the 2022 Nonfiction Age Book of the Year and for the 2023 Victorian Premier's Prize for Nonfiction.

Personal life
Gilbert married Ruslan Hodorov, an Israeli national of Russian heritage, in a Jewish ceremony in 2017. In April 2021, she announced that she was divorcing him after she found out that he was having an affair with Kylie Baxter, who was her colleague and PhD supervisor, while also acting as an intermediary between University of Melbourne and Ruslan during Gilbert's imprisonment.

Julian Assange's fiancée Stella Morris claimed after Gilbert's release that she was his cousin. Craig Murray, a former British diplomat who is close to Assange, repeated this claim later. However, a 2011 account of Gilbert and Assange's meeting written by the former for the newspaper The Western Advocate, headquartered in Bathurst, New South Wales, showed no signs of the two having known each other before.

See also
 List of foreign nationals detained in Iran
 Australia–Iran relations
 Hostage diplomacy

References

External links 
 

Living people
Academic staff of the University of Melbourne
Australian people imprisoned abroad
British people imprisoned abroad
Australian people of British descent
Prisoners and detainees of Iran
Inmates of Evin Prison
Year of birth missing (living people)
Women scholars of Islam
British Islamic studies scholars
British women academics
Australian women academics
University of Melbourne alumni
Alumni of Wolfson College, Cambridge